First Look, Chicago Duos is an album by American jazz saxophonist Roscoe Mitchell with Asian American bassist Tatsu Aoki, which was released in 2005 on the Chicago-based Southport label.

Reception

In his review for AllMusic, Scott Yanow states "Stimulated by the virtuosic bassist Tatsu Aoki during a series of freely improvised but purposeful duets, Mitchell utilizes circular breathing liberally, sometimes performing a wild string of notes."

The JazzTimes review by Marc Masters says "Both musicians roam comfortably around the tonal spectrum: Mitchell moves from sliding sax and breathy flute to ringing bells and rattling chimes, while Aoki delivers thick plucks, textured bowing and precise percussion."

In a review for All About Jazz, John Kelman notes that "Mitchell and Aoki explore all manner of dynamic range. Yet despite its unequivocal freedom, First Look rarely becomes harsh or jagged."

Track listing
All compositions by Mitchell / Aoki
 "In" – 8:10
 "East Side Easy" – 5:54
 "Number Five Wings Place" – 8:01
 "The Journey" – 15:11
 "Glide" – 7:53
 "Dot" – 8:00 
 "Journey for the Cause" – 4:53
 "Yoshihashi" – 4:02
 "Out" – 6:37

Personnel
Roscoe Mitchell - reeds, flute, percussion
 Tatsu Aoki – bass, percussion

References

2005 albums
Roscoe Mitchell albums